Iraqi New Zealanders constitute a small population immigrants from Iraq and New Zealand-born people of Iraqi heritage or descent.

The 2006 census found that 6024 New Zealanders were born in Iraq, although the figure of Iraqi New Zealanders will be higher than this as many New Zealand-born children of Iraqis may consider themselves to be Iraqi New Zealanders. The majority of Iraqi New Zealanders came to New Zealand as skilled migrants during the 1990s and many were Assyrian Christians who had been persecuted for their religion. The greatest concentrations of Iraqis are in Auckland and Wellington.

Many Iraqi Christians (predominantly ethnic Assyrians belonging to the Chaldean Catholic, Syriac Catholic, Syriac Orthodox and Protestant churches) live in the North Shore region of Auckland city. These are mainly highly educated Chaldean Christians and who were from Baghdad, the capital of Iraq, and Basra city in the south of Iraq, but originally heiling from Mosul, a city in northern Iraq. They came under the skilled migrant point system category in the mid 1990s. Many of these have settled in the Unsworth Heights and Albany suburbs. The North Shore Iraqi community is one of the fastest growing middle eastern communities in New Zealand. Many Iraqi immigrants had trouble working in their professional fields as there was a lack of employment during the early 1990s; however, by the late 2000s, many had established their own private businesses from private medical clinics to industrial firms.

See also

 Arab diaspora
 Arab New Zealanders
 Lebanese New Zealanders
 Syrian New Zealanders

References

 

Arab New Zealander
 
New Zealand
Ethnic groups in New Zealand